I due sanculotti (Italian for "The two sans-culottes") is a 1966 comedy film written and directed by Giorgio Simonelli starring the comic duo Franco and Ciccio.

Plot 
The brothers Franco and Ciccio La Capra moves to France in the days of the French Revolution, putting themselves in a lot of trouble.

Cast 

Franco Franchi as Franco La Capra
Ciccio Ingrassia as  Ciccio La Capra
Barbara Carroll as  Virginia Carroll
Heidi Hansen as  Luisa
Umberto D'Orsi as  Deville
Luigi Pavese as  Francois
Adriano Micantoni as  Pierre
Giustino Durano as  Prof. Guillotin
Oreste Lionello as  Napoléon Bonaparte
Silvano Tranquilli as  Politic Commissioner Robespierre
Gino Buzzanca

References

External links

I due sanculotti at Variety Distribution

1966 films
Films directed by Giorgio Simonelli
Films scored by Piero Umiliani
French Revolution films
1960s buddy comedy films
Italian buddy comedy films
Depictions of Napoleon on film
Cultural depictions of Maximilien Robespierre
1960s historical comedy films
Italian historical comedy films
1960s Italian films